Gujambal (Guyambal, Kwiambal) is a possible extinct Australian Aboriginal language. It is undocumented.  'Gambuwal' may have been the same language.

References

External links 
 Bibliography of Gujambal people and language resources, at the Australian Institute of Aboriginal and Torres Strait Islander Studies

Unclassified languages of Australia
Extinct languages of Queensland